Ricky Plant (born 23 November 1977) is a British ice hockey player from Telford, UK. He plays right wing.

Career 

Rick Plant began his career with local side Telford Tigers in 1994.  He spent 3 years away from his local side with Milton Keynes Kings, Blackburn Hawks, Swindon Icelords and Guildford Flames.

He returned to Telford for a year in 98/99, before joining the Guildford Flames again where he played until 2004.

In March 2004 he tested positive for "A banned Class 'A' stimulant".  He was banned for 18 months from the game.  Flames who have a very much admired 'drug-freeze' program vowed to give Plant all the 'assistance' he needed in the 'unfortunate circumstances'.

In September 2005, the Flames announced that Rick Plant would be joining the team again after serving his ban.  He swiftly showed fans that he had lost none of his scoring ability scoring 72 points in 47 EPIHL league games, followed by 53 points in 2006–2007.

He signed up to play for Guildford for the 2007–08 season and assigned the club captaincy.

Scoring 22+42, he slowly gained confidence as a captain in taking charge on the ice. The Club confirmed in late May 2008 that he would be returning for his 10th year in a Flames Shirt for the 2008–09 season, coming off his first as a title winning captain.

Plant is the Flames top scoring British player of All-time, and third overall. On 31 January Plant became only the 2nd Flames player of all time to achieve 500 points, with an assist against the Wightlink Raiders.

Year by Year

Medals and Titles

External links
 Guildford Flames
 Hockeydb.com Profile

References 

1977 births
English ice hockey right wingers
Guildford Flames players
Living people
Swindon Icelords players
Telford Tigers players